Pietralata is a 2008 Italian film directed by Gianni Leacche. The film concerns a protest against the current film industry, and it was shot in 2007 in the Pietralata, a quartiere of Rome, in the eastern part of the city.

Plot

The film is set in Rome: Edoardo and Giancarlo, old friends who want to become actors, are reunited after many years and are still determined to realize their dream.

However, they realize the inefficiency of the film industry and also have personal problems: Edoardo falls into a deep depression, and the family of Giancarlo would like him to become a taxi driver. The situation of the two friends is a little relieved by two women, Lucrezia and Francesca, whom they meet.

Cast

 Benedicta Boccoli: Lucrezia
 Carla Magda Capitanio: Francesca
 Claudio Botosso: Edoardo
 Massimo Bonetti: Giancarlo
 Edoardo Velo

References

2008 films
2008 drama films
Italian drama films
2000s Italian-language films
Films set in 2007
Films set in Italy
Films set in Rome
2000s Italian films